Jean Mann JP (née Stewart; 2 July 1889 – 21 March 1964) was a Scottish Labour Party politician and a campaigner for better housing and planning. She was the third female Labour MP in Scotland. She was elected into the House of Commons on 5 July 1945 and left on 18 September 1959.

Early life
Her father was William Stewart, an iron moulder and active trade unionist, and was influential in sparking her passion for improving the lives of others.

In September 1941, the Scottish Branch of the Housing and Town Planning Association organised a conference in Largs to draw attention to the Scottish evidence to the Barlow Commission on the Distribution of the Industrial Population (1940). The conference papers and proceedings were afterwards published in a book titled Replanning Scotland which was edited by Jean Mann.

Parliamentary career
In the Labour landslide at the 1945 general election, Mann was elected as Member of Parliament for Coatbridge. After she had taken the oath, it was realised that her position on the Rent Tribunals under the Rent of Furnished Houses Control (Scotland) Act 1943 was remunerated and that she therefore might hold an 'office of profit under the Crown' which would disqualify her from election. A Select Committee was established which reported that her election was invalid; a Bill was rushed through validating it and indemnifying her from the consequences of acting as an MP while disqualified.

On 19 February 1947, Mann introduced the epithet "twerp" to the House of Commons when referring to a character in the popular radio comedy programme ITMA, during a debate on supplementary estimates.<ref>{{cite news |title=B.B.C. Comedian Called a "Twerp" |url=https://trove.nla.gov.au/newspaper/article/2708136 |newspaper=The Canberra Times|volume=21 |issue=6200 |date=21 February 1947 |page=1 |via=Trove |quote=The word "twerp," was heard for the first time in the House of Commons when Mrs. Jean Mann, during the debate on the supplementary estimates, used it in referring to the B.B.C.'s most publicised comedian Tommy Handley, in his programme, entitled "Itma.}}</ref>

During her seat she focused on issues that affected low-paid women, housewives and their families. She also campaigned for improved regulation of flammable textiles fabrics, having lost her own child to a housefire. However, the 1950s were a tough time politically for the Labour Party, Mann opposed the Left-wing Bevanites, meaning in 1953 she secured her seat on the NEC. However she stood down in 1959 after coming under attack from the right-wing of the party, having defended and voted against the expulsion of Aneurin Bevan. 

She recognised that housing provision in her constituency was inadequate and addressed the issue in her maiden speech. She was quoted stating that the housing situation was “as bad as it possibly can be”, but that the saddest feature “is that which arises when a young woman is about to be confined", during a debate on 25 October 1945.

Mann secured the Coatbridge seat in 1945 and focused on issues that affected low-paid women, housewives and their families.  Fire safety was of great importance to her as she had lost one of her own children in a fire. In 1959, she successfully campaigned for better regulation on flammable textile fabrics. The 1950s were turbulent years for Labour, with rows erupting once again between the left and the right of the party. Mann’s opposition to the left-wing Bevanites helped to win her a seat on the NEC in 1953, but when, two years later, she voted not to expel Aneurin Bevan from the party for disloyalty– a move that displayed both her independence and strength of character—she came under attack from the right wing of the party. She stood down at the 1959 election.

 Early career 
Mann was educated at Bellahouston Academy in Glasgow and became an accountant. She became a secretary for her local Independent Labour Party office, whilst a mother of 5 children, then progressing to be a senior magistrate and vice-chairman of the Scottish Labour party, Mann became a councillor on Glasgow Corporation in 1931.

In 1933 she became housing convener and was a supporter and advocate for the Garden City Movement and was part of the Scottish Branch of the GCTPA/TCPA, expressing favour for low-rise developments over high-rise and wanted to use this model to improve the housing in Glasgow, but it was not financially viable.

Bibliography
Mann, Jean (Ed.) (1941), Replanning Scotland'', Town and Country Planning Association (Scotland).

References

Centre for the Advancement of Women in Politics: Jean Mann

External links
 

1889 births
1964 deaths
Scottish Labour MPs
Members of the Parliament of the United Kingdom for Scottish constituencies
Female members of the Parliament of the United Kingdom for Scottish constituencies
UK MPs 1945–1950
UK MPs 1950–1951
UK MPs 1951–1955
UK MPs 1955–1959
20th-century Scottish women politicians
20th-century Scottish politicians
Independent Labour Party parliamentary candidates
Women councillors in Glasgow